Drewe is a surname of English origin. The name refers to:
Anthony Drewe (contemporary), British lyricist and author
Sir Cedric Drewe, KCVO (1896–1971), British politician; MP 1924–55 and a Knight Commander of the Royal Victorian Order
John Drewe (b. 1948), British purveyor of art forgeries
Julius Drewe (1856–1931), British businessman, retailer and entrepreneur
Robert Drewe (b. 1943), Australian journalist and novelist